North Hall built in 1950 is a historic building on the campus of the University of Florida in Gainesville, Florida, in the United States. It was designed by Guy Fulton in a modified Collegiate Gothic style to provide housing for the student body.

See also 
 University of Florida
 Buildings at the University of Florida
 University of Florida student housing

References 

Buildings at the University of Florida
Guy Fulton buildings
University and college buildings completed in 1950
Residential buildings completed in 1950
1950 establishments in Florida